Jack E.A. Bonner  was a rugby union player who represented Australia.

Bonner, a lock, claimed a total of 8 international rugby caps for Australia.

References

Australian rugby union players
Australia international rugby union players
Rugby union locks